Beer is an alcoholic drink. 

Beer may also refer to:

Places
 Beer, Devon, England, a coastal village
 Beer, Somerset, England, a hamlet
 Beer, Khyber Pakhtunkhwa, Pakistan, a union council
 Beer, Togdheer, Somaliland, a village
 Beer (lunar crater)
 Beer (Martian crater)

Arts and entertainment 
 "Beer" (Blackadder), an episode of the British sitcom Blackadder II
 Beer (film), a 1985 film starring Loretta Swit and Rip Torn
 "Beer" (song), a song by Reel Big Fish
 "Beer!" (Psychostick song), a song by metal band Psychostick
 Beer, a 1999 novel by Chris Walter

Other uses 
 Beer (surname)
 Beer (magazine), a publication from the Campaign for Real Ale
 BEER (Boot Engineering Extension Record), a special data structure at the end of hard disks pointing to "hidden" partitions, see host protected area

See also
 Bear (disambiguation)
 Beare (disambiguation)
 Beers (disambiguation)
 Bere (disambiguation)
 Biar (disambiguation)
 Bier (disambiguation)
 Birr (disambiguation)